Zenon Piątkowski (17 February 1902 – 12 April 1967) was a Polish sports shooter. He competed in the 25 m pistol event at the 1936 Summer Olympics.

References

External links
 

1902 births
1967 deaths
Polish male sport shooters
Olympic shooters of Poland
Shooters at the 1936 Summer Olympics
People from Nasielsk
Sportspeople from Masovian Voivodeship
20th-century Polish people